Peter Anthony Drobach, Sr. (November 23, 1890 – November 24, 1947)  was an American track cyclist who was a professional rider between 1908 and 1922. Especially in the 1910s, he enjoyed many successes in six-day racing.

Major victories 

1910
Six Days of Buffalo (with Alfred Hill)
1913
Six Days of Buffalo (with Paddy Hehir)
Six Days of Newark (with Paddy Hehir)
Six Days of Indianapolis (with Paddy Hehir)

External links 
Peter Drobach's palmares at cyclingwebsite.net

References 

1890 births
1947 deaths
American male cyclists
American track cyclists